Verno Jeremias Phillips (born November 29, 1969) is a Belizean former professional boxer who competed from 1988 to 2008. He is a three-time junior middleweight world champion, having held the WBO title from 1993 to 1995, and the IBF title twice in 2004 and 2008.

Professional career
Phillips turned professional in 1988 and captured the Vacant WBO light middleweight title in 1993 with a win over Lupe Aquino. He defended the title four times before losing a decision to Paul Jones of England. In 2004 Phillips captured the vacant IBF light middleweight title by beating Carlos Bojorquez via a TKO, but lost the belt in his next fight to Kassim Ouma.  He lost his next bout to Ike Quartey, but in 2006 rallied with wins over Juan Carlos Candelo and Teddy Reid, televised by ESPN. 
On March 27, 2008, Phillips beat Cory Spinks by disputed split decision to regain the IBF light middleweight title.

Philips signed to fight the young Paul Williams on November 29, 2008 on HBO for the vacant WBO interim light middleweight title, vacating his IBF title in the process. Phillips ended up losing the bout the after his cornerman, Trevor Wittman, stopped the fight at the end of the eighth round, resulting in only the second loss via TKO in his career.

Professional boxing record

References

External links

1969 births
Belizean male boxers
International Boxing Federation champions
Living people
World Boxing Organization champions
People from Belize City
Middleweight boxers
World light-middleweight boxing champions